Route M is a short arterial highway in Jefferson County, Missouri.  It is a major east–west route which connects Route 21 to Interstate 55.  For the majority of its length, Route M is a four lane divided highway with limited access.  At its junction with Interstate 55, Route M becomes an undivided two lane road until its eastern terminus at U.S. 61/67.  Route M was rerouted to its present location in the late 1990s after traffic became too great for the original road to handle.  The original route is now known as Old Route M.

Route description
Route M begins as a four-lane divided highway at a diamond interchange with Route 21 near the community of Otto. West of the interchange, the highway is called Route MM.  The highway heads east for less than  where it has a partial cloverleaf interchange with the former alignment of Route 21, appropriately named Old Route 21.  It continues east where there are two turn-offs which connect to nearby grade-separated highways.  The first highway is the former alignment of Route M (Old Route M), the second is Old Lemay Ferry Road near the community of Antonia.  Only the eastbound lanes have direct access to Old Lemay Ferry Road.  Access is provided to the westbound lanes via median u-turn crossovers on either side of the intersection.

Route M continues east, where it has two at-grade intersections before entering Barnhart; one at St. Luke's Church Road and the other at Moss Hollow Road.  At Barnhart, the intersection with Marriott Parkway connects Interstate 55 traffic with gas stations and retail stores.  , the I-55 interchange was being reconstructed to better handle access to southbound I-55.  East of the I-55 interchange, Route M becomes a two-lane highway and ends a mile (1.6 km) later at a T intersection with U.S. Route 61 / U.S. Route 67.

Route M, along with Route 21, make up the Jefferson County Scenic Byway.

History

Due to an increasing number of accidents at the intersection with Old Lemay Ferry Road, MoDOT rebuilt the intersection in 2007, with the eastbound lanes only having access to Old Lemay Ferry Road.  Turnarounds built short distances east and west of the intersection allow access to and from the westbound lanes.

On December 7, 2009, access to southbound I-55 was closed when MoDOT began a project to rebuild the interchange.  The project was scheduled to last through the end of 2010.  Southbound access to I-55 from Route M, which had featured a loop ramp, was being relocated to a new roundabout on Metropolitan Boulevard, which will also connect to a park and ride.

As of 2011, the interchange is fully open.  Southbound I-55 access is possible through a roundabout.

Major intersections

Related route
Connector route
A 0.22 mile connector between Rte M and Old Lemay Ferry Road exists in Jefferson County.

References

Transportation in Jefferson County, Missouri
00M (Jefferson County)